The Detroit Connecting Railroad Company  is a Class III shortline railroad owned by the Adrian and Blissfield Rail Road Company.

Company information
Parent: Adrian & Blissfield Rail Road Company
President: Chris Bagwell
Headquarters: 38235 North Executive Drive, Westland, Michigan 48185-1971, USA

Trackage
Location: Detroit, Michigan, USA 
Mileage 
Connection with: Canadian National Shore Line and Mt. Clemens subdivisions

Commodities transported
Finished Metal Products
Scrap Metal
Vegetables
Chemicals

References

External links

Detroit Connecting Railroad

Railway companies established in 1998
Michigan railroads
Companies based in Wayne County, Michigan
Transportation in Detroit
Spin-offs of the Canadian National Railway